National University of Uzbekistan (NUUz) is a public university located in Tashkent, Uzbekistan. NUUz is the oldest and largest university in Uzbekistan.

National University of Uzbekistan is named after Mirzo Ulugbek. NUUz professors and teaching staff work with modern materials and science and have relationships with the world's distinguished scientific schools.

History

Higher educational institutions originated in eastern Iran in the 10th century CE and spread to major urban centers throughout the Middle East by the late 11th century. Simultaneously, universities were established in the West.

In the beginning of the 20th century, jadids tried to establish universities with the collaboration of Russian democrats. Muslim People University was headed by a council consisting of 45 people. It aimed to offer higher, secondary and primary education. In autumn, Muslim People University and its founders were the first victims of repression from communists.

The government of the Soviet Union, headed by Lenin, founded Turkestan People's University in 1918 with 1,200 students. It was renamed to Turkestan State University in 1920, then renamed to First Central Asian State University in 1923 and  renamed again to Tashkent State University, named after Lenin in 1961 and finally named National University of Uzbekistan after Uzbekistan's independence.

In 1961-1969, NUUz won the first place among institutions in Central Asia in the contemporary system of education and became one of the most prestigious higher institutions of the Soviet Union. Many Central Asian national universities were established on the basis of the NUUz, including Abai Kazakh National Pedagogical University (1925), High Pedagogy Institute of Tajikistan (1932) and the Institute of Agriculture of Tajikistan (1931).

During World War II, many academics relocated from cities in the western USSR to Central Asia, Tashkent and Alma-Ata, which were favored for their European-style infrastructure and the presence of a significant number of Russian speakers.

In the spring of 2008, the President of the Republic of Uzbekistan, Islam Karimov, signed the resolution of the 90th anniversary from the date of foundation of the university in September 1918.

In September 2018, two joint faculties with Kazan Federal University and Holonsky Israeli Technical Institute began to function.

Organization
The 15 faculties and 74 departments include:

 Applied mathematics and intellectual technologies
Mathematics
Physics
Geology and geoinformation systems
Geography and natural resources
Chemistry
Biology
Social sciences
History
Economics
Foreign Philology
Journalism
Taekwondo and sport studies
Uzbek-Israel joint faculty of Mathematical engineering and computer science

An academic lyceum named after S. H. Sirojiddinov operates under NUU. It was founded in 1970 as a boarding school of young physicists and mathematicians. Over 100 PhD professors and over 200 PhD associate professors are among the lyceum's graduates.

Campuses and museums

There are 9 hostels on the “Yoshlik” campus, in which over 3200 undergraduate and graduate students live. Internet service, computer classes, international and trunk calls, a student's clinic, a sports and recreation facility, dry cleaning, dressmakers and shoemakers, training and cultural centers, libraries, dining halls, a market and shops are at the disposal of the students. Rooms for spirituality and enlightenment and also living rooms in each hostel for teachers who continue the training process with the students after classes.

Museums 

NUUz has 5 museums.

History of the University Museum 
This museum is designed to demonstrate the contribution of NUUz in the spread of scientific knowledge throughout Central Asia.

Rare Manuscripts Museum 
Founded on March 31, 2006, this museum contains manuscripts dated to the 16th-20th centuries in the Uzbek, Tajik, Persian, Turkish and Arabic languages. These manuscripts have been kept in the University's Information and Resource Centre for 80 years. This collection began to be compiled in 1920. One of the most valuable literary pieces is Zafarnoma by Sharafiddin Ali Yazdi, created in 1454 and illustrated 12 years after its creation by a calligrapher Kamoliddin Bekhzod. Another copy of Zafarnoma is in the library of Paris University. It also holds a copy of the Quran made during the reign of the Moguls in the 16th century. In addition, works of A.N Avoi (Khamsa), Z.M.Babur's (Baburnoma, The Deeds of Tamerlane, Iskandarnoma) and other similar precious manuscripts are archived.

Archaeology and Ethnology Museum 
Incorporating archaeological finds collected in Uzbekistan and Turkmenistan. Educational archaeological expeditions of the members of the sub-department “The Archaeology of Central Asia” have filled the museum expositions.

Zoology Museum 
The zoology collection exhibits the largest scientific compilation in the country, gathered and maintained for over 100 years, encompassing 23,500 specimens. It includes 560 species of birds, a collection of vertebrates, rare and endangered species, as well as the exhibits of 129 kinds of unique and unprotected mammals.

Geology Museum 
1400 exhibits of petrified plants and animals from the paleolithic age are displayed.

Degrees 
The Bachelor's degree (4 years) has 46 programs.

The Master's degree (2 years after Bachelor's) has 76 programs.

The PhD (3 years after Master's) has 68 programs.

A D.Sc. (2–3 years after PhD) is offered.

Notable alumni

 Tamara Abaeva, historian
 Elyor Karimov
 Rashid Kadyrov
 Maimul Ahsan Khan
Bakhadyr Khoussainov, mathematician, Humboldt Prize winner
 Jahangir Mamatov
 Vladimir Vapnik, developer of support vector machines
Abdulla Aripov, awarded the title Hero of Uzbekistan 
Zamira Ismailovna Usmanova, archaeologist and first woman graduated at the National University of Uzbekistan
Ruslan Medzhitov

Erkin Vakhidov
Ozod Sharafuddinov
Sadi Sirajitdinov
Tashmukhammad Sarimsakov
Obid Sadikov
Sadik Azimov
Ubay Oripov
Habib Abdullaev
Gulam Karimov
Ibrakhim Muminov
Prof.Eduard Yakubov
Victoria Vladimirovna Belaga
Shavkat Ayupov

See also 

Inha University in Tashkent
Tashkent State Technical University
Tashkent Institute of Irrigation and Melioration
Tashkent Financial Institute
Tashkent Automobile and Road Construction Institute
Management Development Institute of Singapore in Tashkent
Tashkent State University of Economics
Tashkent State Agrarian University
Tashkent State Institute of Oriental Studies
Tashkent State University of Law
Tashkent University of Information Technologies
University of World Economy and Diplomacy
Westminster International University in Tashkent

References

External links 
Mirzo Ulugbek & Science

Educational institutions established in 1918
Education in Tashkent
Buildings and structures in Tashkent
1918 establishments in Uzbekistan